Antony Garnet was an English academic  during the 16th-century: he graduated B.A. from Balliol College, Oxford in 1547 and M.A. in 1551; and was  Master of Balliol from 1560 to 1563.

In 1557, when he was still a Fellow of Balliol College, he donated a silver spoon to the college's chapel.

References

16th-century English people
Alumni of Balliol College, Oxford
Masters of Balliol College, Oxford